Kornelius Olai Person Bergsvik (18 March 1889 – 2 May 1975) was a Norwegian politician for the Labour Party, born in Austrheim, Hordaland. Bergsvik represented Hordaland in the Norwegian Parliament from 1928 to 1945. In 1936 he was appointed to the Nygaardsvold Cabinet. Bergsvik served as Minister of Social Affairs 1935–1936, and Minister of Finance 1936–1939. After resigning from the government in 1939, he was County Governor of Telemark from 1939 to 1940, and again from 1945 to 1959.

References

1889 births
1975 deaths
Government ministers of Norway
County governors of Norway
Ministers of Finance of Norway